John Christopher Ethridge (February 10, 1947 – April 23, 2012) was an American country rock bass guitarist.  He was a member of the International Submarine Band (ISB) and The Flying Burrito Brothers, and co-wrote several songs with Gram Parsons. Ethridge worked with Nancy Sinatra, Judy Collins, Leon Russell, Delaney Bramlett, Johnny Winter, Randy Newman, Graham Nash, Ry Cooder, Linda Ronstadt, The Byrds, Jackson Browne, and Willie Nelson.

Career
Ethridge was born in Meridian, Mississippi, United States. He began playing in local bands in the South before moving to California aged 17, having been spotted in Biloxi.  He played with Joel Scott Hill before joining Gram Parsons in ISB; in 1971, Hill and Ethridge would record a trio album (L.A. Getaway) with drummer John Barbata, best known for his work with The Turtles and Jefferson Starship.  He played with Parsons after the end of ISB, and again after Parsons left The Byrds, before cofounding the Burrito Brothers with him.  He played bass and piano on The Gilded Palace of Sin, but left before Burrito Deluxe due to creative differences. When Parsons left the Burritos, Ethridge briefly played with him again, touring with Byron Berline, Emmylou Harris, Clarence White, Gene Parsons, Sneaky Pete Kleinow, and Roland White in 1973. After Parsons' death, Ethridge played in 1974 with the Docker Hill Boys, an informal group which included Gene Parsons and Joel Scott Hill.  These three refounded the Burritos in 1975 with Sneaky Pete and Gib Guilbeau, recording Flying Again.

Ethridge left the Burritos again in February 1976, returning to session work.  He had been a session musician throughout his career, recording with many leading country-tinged acts, including Nancy Sinatra, Judy Collins, Johnny Winter, Ry Cooder, Leon Russell, Randy Newman, Linda Ronstadt, The Byrds and Jackson Browne.  He also toured with Willie Nelson's band for almost eight years, and later played with the Kudzu Kings.

Ethridge died on April 23, 2012, at age 65 at a hospital in Meridian, Mississippi of complications from pancreatic cancer.

Discography

On the following albums, Ethridge played bass unless stated otherwise:

References

External links 
 
 Chris Ethridge credits at MSN Music

1947 births
2012 deaths
Musicians from Meridian, Mississippi
Folk bass guitarists
American rock bass guitarists
American country rock musicians
The Flying Burrito Brothers members
Deaths from pancreatic cancer
Deaths from cancer in Mississippi
American country bass guitarists
American session musicians
Guitarists from Mississippi
American male bass guitarists
20th-century American bass guitarists
Country musicians from Mississippi
20th-century American male musicians
International Submarine Band members